Parvez M. Taj (born March 11, 1977) is Canadian-born artist and entrepreneur based in Los Angeles, California associated with pioneering UV-cured inks as a fine art medium. The founder of Parvez Michel, Inc. is also known for his use of eco-friendly ink and reclaimed materials, such as wood siding, as the palette for his artwork. His combination of objects with texture, water paints, photographs, UV-cured inks and even computer software all contribute to Taj's signature style.

Early life and education
Parvez Taj was born and raised in Amherst, Nova Scotia. His father, a doctor, was from Rajasthan, India, while his mother, a lawyer, was from London, England. For five years of his education, he attended boarding school at Ridley College, St. Catharines, Ontario.

He then attended the University of Western Ontario in London, Ontario, where he earned a Bachelor's degree in economics and finance in 1999. During his summer vacations, Taj began serving as an intern in New York's corporate fashion houses for Calvin Klein and Hugo Boss where he learned the flow of sales cycles, seasonal trends and product lines.

After graduating, Taj moved to New York City where he privately worked on his artworks while publicly producing fashion shows, events and photo shoots for Colin Cowie  and Antony Todd. As head of production for these notable designers, Taj learned to take a design from concept to reality and to manage time/budget constraints.

Taj then traveled to India for a year to shoot a documentary for a nonprofit organization. The documentary was used to educate donors on the use of funding and was shown at the World Social Forum 2002 in Porto Alegre, Brazil. In his free time, Taj honed his craft in video and wall art which laid the groundwork for his later career as an artist.

Continuing his education the following year, Taj earned his MBA degree from Pepperdine University in Malibu, California where he majored in entrepreneurship. There he learned the fundamentals of running a business and how to bring a product to market. During this time, he further defined his style creating and selling his art to private investors while setting up his company as an LLC.

For his summer internship, Taj traveled to Hong Kong and Indonesia where he exclusively focused on his arts, selling several pieces to local collectors. In his final year at Pepperdine, Taj won first place in the Pepperdine Business Plan competition. He used these proceeds to launch his business and career as an artist/designer after graduation.

Career

Parvez began his artistic career in 1999 after attending an art show in London, Ontario, Canada.  The artist, Phil Rubinoff, was blending photography with a technology that had never before existed and Taj, a passionate photographer, thought this would be a fun medium to explore. This hobby quickly became his favorite pastime and within four years became his full-time career.

Taj's distinct technique has evolved from mixing just photography to layering photographs with paints, and from printing on canvas to printing on such diverse mediums such as aluminum, reclaimed white barn siding and other exotic substrates. Since 1999, he has produced over 1,000 works. In addition, he has been working with video as an art medium for over 10 years producing 36 shorts, one documentary and currently, content using 3D video production technology.

In 2003, Taj founded Parvez Michel, Inc. in Beverly Hills, CA. In addition to paintings, Taj has produced furniture light fixtures, acrylic boxes and ping-pong tables.

Taj Parvez's artwork can be seen in retail outlets such as Gilt Groupe, Wayfair, Spacify and Design Public. Additionally, his pieces have been featured in W Magazine, Residential Architect,  InteriorDesign, Luxury Activist, Materialicious, and Inhabit.com.

References

External links
Official site

1977 births
Artists from Nova Scotia
Canadian emigrants to the United States
Canadian people of Indian descent
Living people
People from Amherst, Nova Scotia
University of Western Ontario alumni